The Journal of Industrial Engineering and Management is a biannual peer-reviewed open access scientific journal that covers research on all aspects of industrial engineering and management. It was established in 2008. It is a member of the Open Access Scholarly Publishers Association.

Abstracting and indexing 
The journal is abstracted and indexed in:
 Ei Compendex
 Latindex
 Scopus
 Emerging Sources Citation Index

References

External links 
 

Business and management journals
Biannual journals
Publications established in 2008
English-language journals
Open access journals
Industrial engineering journals